During the Parade of Nations section of the 1992 Winter Olympics opening ceremony, athletes from the participating countries marched into the arena. Each delegation was led by a flag bearer and a sign with the name of the country on it. The Parade of Nations was organized in French, the official languages of France. As tradition dictates, Greece led the parade and France was the last to march to the stadium as the host nation.

List

References

External links
 Official video

1992 Winter Olympics
Lists of Olympic flag bearers